Blowhard, is a rural locality  north-west of Ballarat, in western Victoria, Australia. It is located between Creswick and Learmonth. Blowhard was once a prominent mining area.

Mt Blowhard Primary School was erected by the Education Department in 1878 and is still operating as a primary school.

At the 2021 census, Blowhard had a population of 82.

References

Ballarat
Mining towns in Victoria (Australia)